= Quadfest =

Quadfest is a yearly event at Radford University in Radford, Virginia. To try to distract students away in 1996 the university started "Quadfest", a music festival sponsored by several campus organizations and evolved over the years into a weekend long party which police have categorized as a "near riot." The event is traditionally held two weekends before Radford University's final spring exams and begins on Wednesday night as students finish the day's classes and continues until late Sunday night.

== The changing face of Quadfest ==
Although the event began as an on-campus music festival sponsored by organizations within the university, it quickly evolved into the biggest off-campus party weekend of the year. By contrast, attendance at on-campus events dwindled. Starting in 2006, Quadfest was no longer a school sponsored event.

Starting that year, students sent out mass messages via the social networking website Facebook in order to coordinate the date of the event which they planned to hold despite the lack of on-campus activities. Since 2006, the event has survived and thrived as an unofficial, student-led staple of the university.

== University stance ==
Following the end of official Quadfest events, the university and local law enforcement have tried to limit the unlawful activities at Quadfest.
